Châu Giang is a ward of Duy Tiên town in Hà Nam Province, Vietnam.

References

Populated places in Hà Nam province